Tewes is a surname and may refer to:
Donald Edgar Tewes (1916–2012), American politician from Wisconsin; U.S. representative 1957–59
Jan-Peter Tewes (born 1968), German Olympic field hockey player
Lauren Tewes (born 1953), American television and stage actress
Paul Tewes (contemporary), American political strategist for the Barack Obama campaign
Stefan Tewes (born 1967), German Olympic field hockey player

See also
Tewe (disambiguation)

Surnames from given names
Low German surnames